Almerigogna Mansion is a mansion in Koper, a port town in south-western Slovenia. It is one of the most significant Gothic monuments in the town.

References

Palaces and mansions in Koper
Gothic architecture in Slovenia